Alfredo Felipe Fuentes (born May 26, 1949) is a Cuban journalist.

He was an independent journalist, a member of an illegal trade union (the United Council of Cuban Workers), and an activist in the Varela project.

He was arrested during the "Black Spring" in 2003 and sentenced to 26 years in prison.

External links
 Profile  at Payolibre.com

References

1949 births
Cuban journalists
Male journalists
Cuban dissidents
Cuban democracy activists
Living people